WHPC (90.3 FM) is a non-commercial radio station licensed by the Federal Communications Commission (FCC) to Garden City, New York. The station is owned and operated by Nassau Community College, and began broadcasting on October 27, 1972.

WHPC was nominated for "Best College Radio Station" at the 2019 National Association of Broadcasters Marconi Awards, the only Community College radio station to receive the honor that year.

WHPC won three awards at the 2018 Intercollegiate Broadcasting System awards: Best On-Air Schedule, Best Sports Report, and Best Training Manual.

WHPC won five awards at the 2019 Intercollegiate Broadcasting System awards: Best Community College radio station in the NATION, Best Morning Show (for “The Nassau Morning Madhouse”), Best Artist/Celebrity Interview (Herb Alpert, interview by Michael Anthony), Best On-Air Schedule, and Best Public Affairs Show (Your Family's Health).

WHPC won seven awards at the 2021 Intercollegiate Broadcasting System awards: Best Community College radio station in the NATION, the Abraham & Borst Best Overall College Radio Station,  Best Morning Show (for “The Nassau Morning Madhouse”), Best Station ID, Best Underwriting Announcement, Best Use of Social Media, and Best College Radio Station Advisor (Shawn Novatt.)

See also 
WBAU — defunct student radio station owned by Adelphi University that shared WHPC's frequency from 1972 to 1995.

References

External links 
 

HPC
Mass media in Nassau County, New York
HPC
Nassau Community College
Radio stations established in 1972
1972 establishments in New York (state)